Girls in Malayalam and Thiraikku Varadha Kathai in Tamil, is a 2016 Indian horror thriller film directed by Thulasidas. The film stars Nadhiya, with Eden and Ineya in supporting roles. The film released to negative reviews in October 2016.

Plot
A group of friends are doing a diploma course at a film institute. As part of their studies, they have to make a movie, and the intriguing incidents during their film shoot at the high range form the plot.

Cast

Nadhiya as Deepika
Ineya as Sophia
Eden as Rehana/Merlin
Aarthi as Soundarya
Archana Suseelan as Anmary
Reshma Pasupuleti as Clara
Subiksha as Swathi
Sajitha Madathil as the college professor
Neena Kurup as the psychologist
Kovai Sarala as Komalam
Sabitha Anand as Sophia's mother
Ambika Mohan as Merlin's mother
Sethu Lakshmi as Meenakshi
Parvathi T as lecturer

Production
In December 2014, director Thulasidas announced that he would make a bilingual Malayalam and Tamil horror thriller titled Girls featuring actress Iniya in the lead role. Initially titled Ini Varum Naatkal in Tamil, seven more actresses, Anusree, Aparna Nair, Archana, Muktha Bhanu, Subiksha and Seetha Lekshmi were signed in January 2015 to play other roles, with the shoot beginning thereafter in Wagomon. As the film progressed, some actresses dropped out and were replaced by actresses including Reshma, Sabitha, Sajitha Madathil and Neena Kurup, while Nadhiya also joined in late 2015 to play a significant character.

Soundtrack
The songs was composed by M. G. Sreekumar

Release
The Times of India gave the Tamil version of the film a negative review, citing "the pre-release buzz around Thiraikku Varaadha Kadhai has mostly centred around a lesbian angle in the film, but that proves to be counter-productive", adding that "the film is also irresponsible in a way because it furthers the negative stereotyping of LGBTs as persons with low moral values and murderers". Similarly, The New Indian Express stated "it was a knot that had the potential to turn into a riveting thriller, but it’s opportunity lost here". Likewise, the Malayalam version garnered similar reviews, with a reviewer noting "Thulasidas is a veteran who has directed around 25 films as well as some long running popular serials. So he is not short on experience but his latest bi-lingual offering, Girls, seems an amateurish attempt by someone in the initial days of his directing career".

References

External links
 

2016 films
Indian multilingual films
Indian horror thriller films
2016 horror thriller films
Films about women in India
Indian LGBT-related films
Lesbian-related films
2010s Tamil-language films
2016 multilingual films
Films directed by Thulasidas
2010s Malayalam-language films